Erich Hecke (20 September 1887 – 13 February 1947) was a German mathematician known for his work in number theory and the theory of modular forms.

Biography
Hecke was born in Buk, Province of Posen, German Empire (now Poznań, Poland). He obtained his doctorate in Göttingen under the supervision of David Hilbert.

Kurt Reidemeister and Heinrich Behnke were among his students.

In 1933 Hecke signed the Loyalty Oath of German Professors to Adolf Hitler and the National Socialist State, but was later known as being opposed to the Nazis.

Hecke died in Copenhagen, Denmark.

André Weil, in the foreword to his text Basic Number Theory says: "To improve upon Hecke, in a treatment along classical lines of the theory of algebraic numbers, would be a futile and impossible task", referring to Hecke's book "Lectures on the Theory of Algebraic Numbers."

Research
His early work included establishing the functional equation for the Dedekind zeta function, with a proof based on theta functions. The method extended to the L-functions associated to a class of characters now known as Hecke characters or idele class characters; such L-functions are now known as Hecke L-functions. He devoted most of his research to the theory of modular forms, creating the general theory of cusp forms (holomorphic, for GL(2)), as it is now understood in the classical setting.

Recognition
He was a Plenary Speaker of the ICM in 1936 in Oslo.

See also
 List of things named after Erich Hecke
 Hecke algebra (disambiguation)
 Tate's thesis

References

External links

1887 births
1947 deaths
People from Poznań County
People from the Province of Posen
20th-century German mathematicians
Number theorists
Academic staff of the University of Hamburg
Academic staff of the University of Basel
Academic staff of the University of Göttingen
University of Breslau alumni
University of Göttingen alumni